Songs by Keith Getty, listed in alphabetical order (current through 2005). Some songs may be known by more than one title. Official lyrics pages at GettyMusic (linked below) also have audio samples.

External links
Official song lyrics, sheet music, and recordings available from Getty Music
Song data also available to subscribers of CCLI
 Southern Baptist Theological Seminary topical index of Getty/Townend hymns
 Review of four Advent and Christmas songs by Keith Getty, in Reformed Worship

References 

Getty, Keith